Maharani's Arts and Commerce College for Women, Mysore, is a women's general degree college located at Mysore, Karnatka. It was established in the year 1902. The college is affiliated with University of Mysore. This college offers different undergraduate and postgraduate courses in arts and commerce.

Departments

Journalism and Mass Communication, Philosophy, Economics, English, Geography, History, Kannada, Music, Political Science, Psychology, Sociology. Urdu, Hindi, Sanskrit, criminology and forensic science.

Accreditation
The college is  recognized by the University Grants Commission (UGC).
Accreditation by University of Mysore, Mysuru

References

External links
https://gfgc.kar.nic.in/macw-mysore/

Educational institutions established in 1902
1902 establishments in India
University of Mysore
Colleges affiliated to University of Mysore
Universities and colleges in Mysore
Women's universities and colleges in Karnataka
Academic institutions formerly affiliated with the University of Madras